Varzea is a genus of skinks.

Species
The following 2 species, listed alphabetically by specific name, are recognized as being valid:

Varzea altamazonica (Miralles, Barrio-, Rivas, Chaparro-Auza, 2006)  
Varzea bistriata (Spix, 1825) – two-striped mabuya

Nota bene: A binomial authority in parentheses indicates that the species was originally described in a genus other than Alinea.

References

 
Lizard genera
Taxa named by Stephen Blair Hedges
Taxa named by Caitlin E. Conn